Reijo Laksola (born 10 August 1952) is a Finnish ice hockey player. He competed in the men's tournament at the 1976 Winter Olympics.

References

External links
 

1952 births
Living people
Finnish ice hockey forwards
HIFK (ice hockey) players
Ilves players
Iserlohn Roosters players
Jokerit players
KOOVEE players
Olympic ice hockey players of Finland
Ice hockey players at the 1976 Winter Olympics
People from Seinäjoki
Sportspeople from South Ostrobothnia